Georg Vierling (5 September 1820 – 1 June 1901) was a German musician and composer. He is noted for modernizing the secular oratorio form.

Life and career
Georg Vierling was born in Frankenthal, and studied music with Christian Heinrich Rinck in Darmstadt and composer Adolf Bernhard Marx in Berlin. In 1847 he became an organist in Frankfurt, and later director of the Singing Academy and in 1852 director of the Song Board in Mainz. In 1853 Vierling founded the Bach Verein in Berlin, and in 1859 he became Director of Music at the Royal Academy of the Arts in Berlin. In 1883 he became a member of the Prussian Academy of Arts. He died in Wiesbaden. After his death, memorial performances of his cantatas were held in Stuttgart. Notable students include George Lichtenstein.

Works
Vierling's compositions include songs and choral works, piano and organ works, overtures and one symphony. Selected works include:

Hero and Leander
The robbery of the Sabinerinnen
Constantin
Alarich
The gentleman instructed his angels
Sturm
Maria Stuart
Im Frühling
Hermannsschlacht
Tragic Overture
String Quartet (No.2, Op. 76) in A major

Vierling also wrote the libretti for a cantata of Max Bruch.

References

External links
 

1820 births
1901 deaths
German Romantic composers
German music educators
People from Frankenthal
People from the Palatinate (region)
Pupils of Adolf Bernhard Marx
German male classical composers
19th-century German musicians
20th-century German male musicians
19th-century German male musicians